The Draughtsman's Contract is a 1982 British comedy-drama film written and directed by Peter Greenaway – his first conventional feature film (following the feature-length mockumentary The Falls). Originally produced for Channel 4, the film is a form of murder mystery, set in rural Wiltshire, England in 1694 (during the joint reign of William III and Mary II). The period setting is reflected in Michael Nyman's score, which borrows widely from Henry Purcell, and in the extensive and elaborate costume designs (which, for effect, slightly exaggerate those of the period). The action was shot on location in the house and formal gardens of Groombridge Place. The film received the Grand Prix of the Belgian Film Critics Association.

Plot
Mr Neville, a young and conceited artist, is contracted  by Mrs Virginia Herbert  to produce a series of twelve landscape drawings of her country house, its outbuildings and gardens, as a gift for her cold and neglectful husband, who is currently away on business.

Part of the contract is that Mrs Herbert agrees to comply with Mr Neville’s sexual demands. Several sexual encounters between them follow, each indicating reluctance or distress on the part of Mrs Herbert, and sexual aggression or insensitivity on the part of Mr Neville. During his stay, Mr Neville becomes disliked by several of the estate's inhabitants and visitors, especially by Mrs Herbert's son-in-law, Mr Talmann.

Eventually Mrs Herbert, wearied by Mr Neville’s excessive sexual appetite, tries to terminate the contract before the drawings are completed. But Neville refuses and their encounters continue as before. Then Mrs Herbert's married but childless daughter, Mrs Talmann, frustrated by her husband’s lack of interest in sex, blackmails Neville into a second contract, in which he agrees to comply with her sexual demands, rather than she with his. Mrs Talman wishes to become pregnant, and knows this is unlikely to happen with her husband.

Mr Herbert does not return when expected, and his dead body is eventually discovered in the moat. Mr Neville completes his drawings and leaves, but returns to make an unlucky thirteenth drawing. During his visit, he is surprised when Mrs Herbert propositions him for sex, and they make love. Mrs Herbert also indicates that her daughter’s plan to conceive a child by Mr Neville has been successful.

In the evening, while Mr Neville is apparently finishing the final sketch, he is approached by a masked man, obviously Mr Talmann in disguise, who is then joined by the estate manager and Mrs Herbert's former fiancé, Mr Noyes, her neighbour Mr Seymour, and the Poulenc twins, eccentric local landowners.

The party accuses Mr Neville of the murder of Mr Herbert, for the drawings can be interpreted to suggest more than one illegal act and to implicate more than one person. They also accuse him of the sexual violation of Mrs Herbert, as evidenced by his sexual congress with her that afternoon.

Neville realises, too late, that he has been entrapped by Mrs Herbert. Despite his protests, the group of men blind him and beat him to death, finally casting his body into the moat at the place where Mr Herbert's corpse was found.

Cast

Themes
Although there is a murder mystery, its resolution is not explicit; it is implied that the mother (Mrs. Herbert) and daughter (Mrs. Talmann) planned the murder of Mr. Herbert. Mrs. Herbert and Mrs. Talmann were aided by Mr. Clarke, the gardener, and his assistant.

In order to keep the estate in their hands, they needed an heir. Because Mr. Talmann was impotent, they used Mr. Neville as a stud. Mr. Herbert was murdered at the site where Mr. Neville is murdered. (In the original treatment, Mr. Herbert is murdered on his return on the 12th day and the site was vetoed as a painting site, because it was instead to be used as a murder site.)

Background 
The film was inspired when Greenaway, who trained as an artist before becoming a filmmaker, spent three weeks drawing a house near Hay-on-Wye while holidaying with his family. Much like Mr. Neville in the final film, every day he would work on a particular view at a set time, to preserve the lighting effects while sketching from day to day. The hands shown drawing in the film are Greenaway's own, as are the completed drawings.

The original cut of the film was about three hours long. The opening scene was about 30 minutes long and showed each character talking, at least once, with every other character. Possibly to make the film easier to watch, Greenaway edited it to 103 minutes. The opening scene is now about 10 minutes long and no longer shows all the interactions among all of the characters.  Some anomalies in the longer version film are deliberate anachronisms: the depiction of the use of a cordless phone in the 17th century and the inclusion on the walls of the house of paintings by Greenaway in emulation of Roy Lichtenstein which are partly visible in the released version of the film.

The released final version provides fewer explanations to the plot's numerous oddities and mysteries. The main murder mystery is never solved, though little doubt remains as to who did it. The reasons for the 'living statue' in the garden and why Mr. Neville attached so many conditions to his contract were also more developed in the first version.

Locations
Groombridge Place was the main location in this tale of 17th-century intrigue and murder.

Music

Michael Nyman's score is derived from grounds by Henry Purcell overlaid with new melodies.  The original plan was to use one ground for every two of the twelve drawings but Nyman states in the liner notes that this was unworkable.  The ground for one of the most popular pieces, "An Eye for Optical Theory", is considered to be probably composed by William Croft, a contemporary of Purcell.  The goal was to create a generalized memory of Purcell, rather than specific memories, so a piece as readily recognizable as "Dido's Lament" was not considered an acceptable source of a ground.  Purcell is credited as a "music consultant".

The album was the fourth album release by Michael Nyman and the third to feature the Michael Nyman Band. "It's like harpsichord and a lot of strings, woodwind and a bit of brass," remarked Neil Hannon, frontman of The Divine Comedy. "Somehow they just manage to… rock. With a vengeance."

The following ground sources are taken from the chart in Pwyll ap Siôn's The Music of Michael Nyman:  Text, Context and Intertext, reordered to match their sequence on the album.

Track listing
 "Chasing Sheep Is Best Left to Shepherds"- 2:33 (King Arthur, Act III, Scene 2, Prelude (as Cupid descends))
 "The Disposition of the Linen"- 4:47 ("She Loves and She Confesses Too" (Secular Song, Z.413))
 "A Watery Death"- 3:31 ("Pavan in B flat," Z. 750; "Chaconne" from Suite No. 2 in G Minor)
 "The Garden Is Becoming a Robe Room"- 6:05 ("Here the deities approve" from Welcome to all the Pleasures (Ode); E minor ground in Henry Playford's collection, Musick's Hand-Maid (Second Part))
 "Queen of the Night"- 6:09 ("So when the glitt'ring Queen of the Night" from The Yorkshire Feast Song)
 "An Eye for Optical Theory"- 5:09 (Ground in C minor (D221) [attributed to William Croft])
 "Bravura in the Face of Grief"- 12:16 ("The Plaint" from The Fairy-Queen, Act V)

The first music heard in the film is, in fact, a bit of Purcell's song "Queen of the Night." "The Disposition of the Linen," in its Nyman formulation, is a waltz, a form that postdates Purcell by 

The album was issued on compact disc in 1989 by Virgin Records, marketed in the United States by Caroline Records under their Blue Plate imprint.  Initially this was indicated with a sticker; it was later incorporated into the back cover design in a much smaller size.

The entire album has been rerecorded by the current lineup of the Michael Nyman Band.  See The Composer's Cut Series Vol. I: The Draughtsman's Contract.

Art references 
The visual references for the film are paintings by Caravaggio, de La Tour, Rembrandt, Vermeer and other Baroque artists and this gives the film a "painterly quality". Greenaway also said: "I consider that 90% of my films one way or another refers to paintings. "Contract" quite openly refers to Caravaggio, Georges de La Tour and other French and Italian artists".

Reception 
The Draughtsman's Contract has a 97% approval rating on Rotten Tomatoes based on 31 reviews, with a weighted average of 8.3/10. The site's consensus reads: "Smart and utterly original, The Draughtsman's Contract is a period piece that marks the further maturation of a writer-director with a thrillingly unique vision". Roger Ebert, who gave the film a full four stars, wrote, "What we have here is a tantalizing puzzle, wrapped in eroticism and presented with the utmost elegance. [...] All of the characters speak in complete, elegant, literary sentences. All of the camera strategies are formal and mannered. The movie advances with the grace and precision of a well-behaved novel." In Slant, a mildly positive Jeremiah Kipp called it "a first, fledgling attempt at what he later perfected, but that modesty could be seen as a virtue, since there is indeed some form of narrative here instead of the nonlinear, compulsive list-making and categorization that drives some people crazy about his other films. [...] The story marches forward like a death march and is resolved with merciless efficiency." Danny Peary wrote that "Greenaway handles everything with such elegance that we are totally unprepared for the final act of cruelty. Ending is haunting; it makes you reassess all that went before – supposed victims are really heartless predators."

Restoration 
In 2003 the BFI restored the film digitally and this restoration was released on DVD. Umbrella Entertainment released the digitally restored film on DVD in Australia, with special features including an introduction and commentary by Peter Greenaway, an interview with composer Michael Nyman, behind the scenes footage and on set interviews, deleted scenes, trailers and a featurette on the film's digital restoration.

See also 
 BFI Top 100 British films

References

External links

Sites
 The Draughtsman's Contract at petergreenaway.org.uk
 
 
 
 
 The Draughtsman's Contract at BFI
 DVD Bonus material – Original proposal

Reviews
 The Draughtsman's Contract, film reference, Sylvia Paskin – detailed bibliography
 922 (63). The Draughtsman’s Contract (1982, Peter Greenaway), Shooting Down Pictures – links and excerpts to many reviews
 The Draughtsman's Contract, James Mackenzie, January 2001
 The Draughtsman's Contract, not coming to a theater near you, David Carter, 12 January 2010
 The Draughtsman's Contract, DVD Beaver – comparison of DVD releases

1982 films
1980s historical films
1980s mystery films
British historical films
British mystery films
Films directed by Peter Greenaway
Films set in the 1690s
Adultery in films
Films set in England
Films set in country houses
Films scored by Michael Nyman
1980s English-language films
1980s British films